Kinyor is a surname of Kenyan origin. Notable people with the surname include:

 Barnabas Kinyor (born 1961), Kenyan 400 metres hurdler
 Job Koech Kinyor (born 1990), Kenyan middle-distance runner, son of Barnabas

Kenyan names